Maida may refer to:

People
 Maida Abdallah (born 1970), Tanzanian politician
 Maida Arslanagić (born 1984), Croatian handball player
 Maida Bryant (1926–2016), New Zealand nurse, politician and community leader
 Maida Coleman (born 1954), American politician
 Maida Heatter, American chef and cookbook writer
 Maida Markgraf (born 1991), Montenegrin footballer
 Maida Townsend, American 21st century politician
 Maida (surname), surname

Places
Maida, Calabria, a comune in the province of Catanzaro, Italy
Maida, North Dakota, an unincorporated community in the United States

Other uses
Maida (flour), a white flour used in South Asia
Battle of Maida, a Napoleonic battle in Calabria during the War of the Third Coalition
French ship Jupiter, captured by the Royal Navy and renamed HMS Maida
Maida (dog), belonging to Sir Walter Scott
The Maida series of children's books, written by Inez Haynes Irwin

See also
Maidu, a California Native American group
Maida Vale (disambiguation)

Feminine given names